The Misquah Hills High Point, or Point 2260 is the unnamed high point of the Misquah Hills and the third highest point in the state of Minnesota. It has 420 feet of clean prominence from its parent, Eagle Mountain, from which it is 5.68 miles isolated.

Point 2230 (at 2230 feet) was considered to be the highest point in the Misquah Hills, and indeed in the state of Minnesota, until the region was resurveyed in 1961. This survey not only established that Eagle Mountain was significantly higher than the Misquah Hills, but found additional points higher than Point 2230 within the Misquah Hills themselves. Thus the high point of the Misquah Hills was established as point 2260 (at 2260 feet), located on the east edge of Winchell Lake.

References

Mountains of Cook County, Minnesota
Mountains of Minnesota